Christian Händle (born 13 May 1965 in Marburg) is a German rower. Together with Ralf Thienel he finished 4th in the double scull at the 1988 Summer Olympics.
He is married to rower Birgit Peter.

References
 
 

1965 births
Living people
German male rowers
Rowers at the 1988 Summer Olympics
Rowers at the 1992 Summer Olympics
Olympic rowers of Germany
Olympic rowers of West Germany
Sportspeople from Marburg
World Rowing Championships medalists for Germany